Volgodonskoy is a rural locality (a settlement) and the administrative center of Sovetskoye Rural Settlement, Kalachyovsky District, Volgograd Oblast, Russia. The population was 1,272 in 2010. There are 14 streets.

Geography 
Volgodonskoy is located 33 km southeast of Kalach-na-Donu (the district's administrative centre) by road. Oktyabrsky is the nearest rural locality.

References 

Rural localities in Kalachyovsky District